John Chaney (January 21, 1932 – January 29, 2021) was an American college basketball coach, best known for his success at Temple University from 1982 through 2006. He was inducted into the Naismith Memorial Basketball Hall of Fame in 2001 and the National Collegiate Basketball Hall of Fame in 2006.

Early life and playing career
Chaney was born in Jacksonville, Florida, but grew up in Philadelphia. He began his career after graduating from Bethune–Cookman College and spending some time in the Eastern Professional Basketball League, first with the Sunbury Mercuries from 1955 to 1963 and Williamsport Billies from 1963 to 1966.

Coaching career
Chaney first became a basketball coach in 1963 at William L. Sayre Junior High School (now high school) at 58th and Walnut Street in Philadelphia. His teams had a 59–9 win–loss record in three seasons. Inheriting a one-win team in 1966 at Simon Gratz High School in Philadelphia, Chaney compiled a 63–23 record in six seasons.

Chaney's first collegiate position was at Cheyney State College, where he coached the Cheyney Wolves in the National Collegiate Athletic Association's (NCAA) Division II. At Cheyney, Chaney had a 232–56 record. Cheyney won the 1978 NCAA Division II men's basketball tournament.

After a decade at Cheyney, Chaney moved on to Temple University in 1982, where he coached the Temple Owls in NCAA Division I. Chaney built a reputation as a tough coach who always demanded excellence on and off the court. He was well known for his early-morning practices, match-up zone defense, tough non-conference scheduling, and winning basketball teams. He won the Henry Iba Award, given annually to the best college basketball coach by the United States Basketball Writers Association, in 1987 and 1988.

On February 13, 1994, Chaney threatened to kill then-University of Massachusetts Amherst coach John Calipari at a post-game news conference, where Calipari was speaking at a podium. Chaney entered the conference mid-speech, calling him an "Italian son-of-a-bitch," accusing Calipari of manipulating the referees. When Calipari attempted to respond to the accusations, Chaney yelled, "Shut up...!", and proceeded to charge the stage, before being stopped by security. While being held back, Chaney shouted, "When I see you, I'm gonna kick your ass!" As security restrained Chaney, he repeatedly yelled, "I'll kill you!" and angrily admitted telling his players to "knock your fucking kids in the mouth." Chaney received a one-game suspension for the incident. The two coaches later reconciled. Chaney praised Calipari's coaching ability and defended him over the Derrick Rose controversy at the University of Memphis.

On December 20, 2004, during a win over Princeton, Chaney became the fifth active coach and 19th all-time to appear on the sidelines for 1,000 games, joining Lou Henson (New Mexico State, Illinois), Bob Knight (Army, Indiana, Texas Tech), Eddie Sutton (Creighton, Arkansas, Kentucky, Oklahoma State, San Francisco), and Hugh Durham (Florida State, Georgia, Jacksonville).

In 2005, Chaney ordered backup forward Nehemiah Ingram into the game to commit hard fouls against Big 5 rival Saint Joseph's in response to what he thought were several missed calls by the referees. After the game Chaney admitted to "sending a message" and stated "I'm going to send in what we used to do years ago, send in the goons." John Bryant of Saint Joseph's suffered a fractured arm as a result of an intentional foul. Following the incident, he suspended himself for one game, and upon hearing the severity of the injury, the university suspended him for the remainder of the regular season. Chaney self-extended the suspension to that year's Atlantic 10 Conference men's basketball tournament.

On March 13, 2006, Chaney announced his retirement from coaching at a press conference, effective after Temple's play in the National Invitation Tournament (NIT). Fran Dunphy was named Chaney's successor following the season. Chaney was later inducted into the Big 5 Hall of Fame, which recognizes the best in Philadelphia's college basketball history. Chaney won a total of 741 career games. He took Temple to the NCAA tournament 17 times. His 1987–88 Owls team entered the NCAA tournament ranked #1 in the country, and he reached the Elite Eight on five occasions. In 2001, Chaney was elected to the Naismith Memorial Basketball Hall of Fame.

Personal life
Chaney and his wife, Jeanne, had a daughter, Pamela. Chaney died on January 29, 2021, at the age of 89.

Head coaching record

Coaching tree
Assistant coaches under Chaney who became NCAA or NBA head coaches
 Dan Leibovitz - Hartford (2006-2010)
 Mark Macon - Binghamton (2009-2012)

See also

 List of college men's basketball coaches with 600 wins

References

Further reading

 "Temple Coach Chaney Announcing Retirement Today", Washington Post, March 13, 2006.
 A Century of Greatness, Denise Dennis. Publisher The Urban League of Philadelphia-P.181, at Sayre rec. of 59&9

External links
 

1932 births
2021 deaths
20th-century African-American sportspeople
21st-century African-American people
African-American basketball coaches
African-American basketball players
American men's basketball coaches
American men's basketball players
Antioch College alumni
Basketball coaches from Florida
Basketball players from Jacksonville, Florida
Bethune–Cookman Wildcats men's basketball players
Cheyney Wolves men's basketball coaches
College men's basketball head coaches in the United States
Harlem Globetrotters players
High school basketball coaches in Pennsylvania
Naismith Memorial Basketball Hall of Fame inductees
Sportspeople from Jacksonville, Florida
Temple Owls men's basketball coaches
Williamsport Billies (basketball) players